In music, Op. 91 stands for Opus number 91. Compositions that are assigned this number include:

 Beethoven – Wellington's Victory
 Brahms – Two Songs for Voice, Viola and Piano
 Britten – Sacred and Profane
 Delius – Two Songs to be sung of a summer night on the water
 Dvořák – In Nature's Realm
 Glière – Horn Concerto
 Margola – Cello Concerto
 Schumann – Romanzen volume II (6 partsongs for women's voices)
 Sibelius – Jäger March